Judy Kuhn (born May 20, 1958) is an American actress, singer and activist, known for her work in musical theatre. A four-time Tony Award nominee, she has released four studio albums and sang the title role in the 1995 film Pocahontas, including her rendition of the song "Colors of the Wind", which won its composers the Academy Award for Best Original Song.

Kuhn made her professional stage debut in 1981 and her Broadway debut in the 1985 original production of the musical The Mystery of Edwin Drood. Subsequent Broadway roles include Cosette in Les Misérables (1987), Florence Vassy in Chess (1988), and Amalia Balash in She Loves Me (1993). For all three, she received Tony Award nominations. She also received an Olivier Award nomination for her 1989 West End debut playing Maria/Futura in Metropolis. Other musical roles include Betty Schaeffer in the 1993 US premiere production of Sunset Boulevard in Los Angeles and her Obie Award winning role as Emmie in the 2001 Off-Broadway production of Eli's Comin. She received a fourth Tony nomination in 2015 for her role as Helen Bechdel in the original Broadway production of Fun Home, and a second Olivier nomination in 2020 for her role as Golde in a London revival of Fiddler on the Roof.

Early life
Kuhn (pronounced ) was born in New York City to Jewish parents and grew up in Bethesda, Maryland. She attended Georgetown Day School in Washington, D.C. She entered Oberlin College. After taking voice lessons with Frank Farina, Kuhn transferred into the Oberlin Conservatory of Music. Kuhn was also interested in musical theater and other types of music, in addition to classical music for which the Conservatory is best known. She trained as an "operatic soprano" at Oberlin, and graduated in 1981.

After college, she moved to Boston, where she waited tables and studied acting. After appearing in summer stock, Kuhn moved back to New York.

Stage career

1985–1989
Her Broadway debut was in Drood, a Rupert Holmes musical based on the unfinished Charles Dickens novel, in 1985. She played the roles of "Alice / Miss Isabel Yearsley / Succubae" and understudied the title role played by Betty Buckley. Her next appearance on Broadway was in the ill-fated Rags, which opened on August 21, 1986, and closed after four performances.

Her next role of Cosette in the 1987 multiple award-winning Broadway production of Les Misérables brought her the first Tony Award nomination, as Best Featured Actress in a Musical (1987), and the Drama Desk Award (1987) nomination as Outstanding Featured Actress in A Musical.

Kuhn appeared in the Trevor Nunn-directed Chess, with music by Benny Andersson and Björn Ulvaeus and lyrics by Tim Rice in the 1988 Broadway transfer from the West End, playing one of the main roles (Florence Vassy). Despite the show's success in London, Trevor Nunn decided to rework it for Broadway from a pop/rock opera as staged in London into a more conventional musical theater piece with a new book by Richard Nelson. As a result, the new show was greeted with mostly negative reviews and closed after less than a two-month run, on June 25, 1988. Kuhn's performance in the musical received praise from the critics. "Her beautiful pop-soprano voice is the show's chief pleasure. She acts the sympathetic, gutsy role with spirit and heart", wrote Variety. The Village Voice noted that "she pours a river of feeling and lush vocal tone into...the role".  She garnered her second Tony Award nomination, this time as Best Actress in a Musical (1988), and a 1988 Drama Desk Award nomination as Outstanding Actress in a Musical. In addition, The Original Broadway Cast recording of the musical was nominated for a Grammy Award.

She reprised her role of Florence Vassy later in January 1989 in a Carnegie Hall concert performance with the rest of the Broadway cast, which was a benefit for the Emergency Shelter Inc. She also performed in a Chess concert version in 1989 in Skellefteå, Sweden, during a chess World Cup final tournament, where she joined with Tommy Körberg and Murray Head, two principal actors from 1986 West End production of the musical.

Kuhn made her London debut in 1989, when she starred in the West End production of Metropolis, with Jeremy Kingston, reviewing for The Times (London) writing "I greatly enjoyed Kuhn's edgy, angular performance." She received an Olivier Award nomination as Best Actress in a Musical.

1990–1996
Kuhn's next major Broadway project, Two Shakespearean Actors (1992), despite a cast that included Brian Bedford, Frances Conroy, Hope Davis, Victor Garber, Laura Innes and Eric Stoltz, was commercially unsuccessful, closing after 29 regular performances.

In 1993, Kuhn played in the Roundabout Theater Company revival of She Loves Me, portraying Amalia Balash, a young Budapest shopgirl who is unaware that the co-worker she despises is the young man with whom she's been sharing an anonymous correspondence. Her performance earned her a Tony Award nomination as Best Actress in a Musical. The 1993 Broadway recording of this revival does not feature Kuhn, who left the production before the album was produced.

In December 1993, Kuhn played the role of Betty Schaefer in the U.S premiere production of Sunset Boulevard at the Shubert Theatre in Los Angeles. The L.A production recorded a cast album, which is the only unabridged cast recording of the show with the original London recording being cut by thirty minutes.

Regional theatre credits in the early 1990s include The Glass Menagerie at the McCarter Theatre, Princeton, New Jersey, in 1991 as "Laura" and Martin Guerre, at the Hartford Stage Company, Hartford, Connecticut, in 1993. Kuhn reprised her role as Cosette in 1995, for the 10th anniversary concert performance at the Royal Albert Hall in London, which was released on DVD as Les Miserables: The Dream Cast in Concert.

1997–2006
Kuhn appeared in the Broadway concert King David which was a 1997 Disney project with a book and lyrics by Tim Rice and music by Alan Menken and directed by Mike Ockrent. It played for a nine-performance limited run at the New Amsterdam Theatre.

Kuhn sang in the second annual benefit concert for The Actors' Fund of Funny Girl in September 2002 at the New Amsterdam Theatre, with different actresses taking on the role of Fanny Brice. She sang "Who Are You Now?" and "People" of which Andrew Gans of Playbill wrote: she "provided an intense, moving, full-voiced 'People,' sensationally belting 'are the luckiest peeeeeeople (wow!) in the wooorld'."

Kuhn's Off-Broadway and regional theater credits in this period include: As Thousands Cheer (1998) Off-Broadway at the Drama Dept., Greenwich House Theater; Strike up the Band (1998) Off-Broadway Encores! Concerts at New York City Center; the title role in The Ballad of Little Jo (2000) at the Steppenwolf Theatre Company in Chicago; Eli's Comin (2001) Off-Broadway at the Vineyard Theatre Company (for which she won an Obie Award); The Highest Yellow (2004) at the Signature Theater in Virginia; and  Three Sisters (2005) In a new adaption by Craig Lucas at the Intiman Theater in Seattle, Washington.

2007–present
On October 23, 2007, Kuhn returned to the Broadway production of Les Misérables after 20 years, this time assuming the role of Fantine. She succeeded Lea Salonga and remained with the show until the revival ended on January 6, 2008.

Kuhn portrayed Fosca in the Off-Broadway Classic Stage Company revival of the Stephen Sondheim-James Lapine musical Passion from its opening in February 2013 through its scheduled closing in April 2013. Kuhn had previously played Fosca in the Stephen Sondheim celebration production in 2002 at the Kennedy Center.

In 2013, Kuhn originated the role of Helen Bechdel in the off-Broadway Public Theater production of the musical Fun Home, which began its run September 30, 2013 and opened officially on October 22, 2013. The run was extended multiple times and closed on January 12, 2014. She played the same role in the Broadway production, which ran from April 2015 to September 10, 2016, at the Circle in the Square.

Kuhn played the role of "Golde" in the Broadway revival of Fiddler on the Roof, starting on November 22, 2016. She played Golde in the Menier Chocolate Factory (London) production of Fiddler on the Roof which began on November 23, 2018, and ran to March 9, 2019.

Career outside theatre
Her television credits include Law & Order and Law & Order: SVU, All My Children and two PBS shows: My Favorite Broadway: The Leading Ladies (recorded 1998, released 1999) and In Performance at the White House: A Tribute to Broadway – The Shows in March 1988.

Kuhn sang the title role in the 1995 Disney animated film Pocahontas. The film's score won an Academy Award, and the soundtrack reached #1 on the Billboard 200, selling over 2.5 million copies. The film included Kuhn's rendition of the song "Colors of the Wind", which won the Academy Award for Best Original Song and a Grammy Award.

Kuhn also sang as Pocahontas in the straight-to-video sequel Pocahontas II: Journey to a New World and in "If You Can Dream", a Disney Princess song. Kuhn briefly appeared in the film Long Time Since (1998) and supplied the vocals for the movie's soundtrack, which includes a rendition of Auld Lang Syne.

She has performed in concert at Carnegie Hall, Alice Tully Hall, and Avery Fisher Hall in Manhattan, the Kennedy Center for the Performing Arts and at the Royal Albert Hall in London. She has performed in a solo cabaret/nightclub act at, for example, Joe's Pub at the Public Theater in October 2007 and the Iridium in New York in January 2008. She performed her solo concert at Feinstein's at Loews Regency in March 2012.

Her first solo album, Just in Time: Judy Kuhn Sings Jule Styne, was released on January 31, 1995. Kuhn's second solo album, Serious Playground: The Songs of Laura Nyro, was released on October 2, 2007. In 2013, she released her third album All This Happiness, which contains pop, jazz, cabaret, and blues songs, along with the title song of the album, from the Stephen Sondheim musical Passion.

Kuhn also teaches a song interpretation class at Michael Howard Studios in New York City, where she studied earlier in her career. Andrew Gans of Playbill wrote that Kuhn "possesses one of the richest and most exciting instruments around; it is also an extremely versatile and rangy voice" and that Kuhn has "remarkable interpretive skills".

Personal life
Kuhn lives with her husband, David Schwab, in New York City. They have one daughter, Anna.

Filmography

Film and television

Stage

Discography

List of albums

Singles

Awards and nominations

Theatre 
Source:IBDB

References

External links

Judy Kuhn's Myspace Page
Judy Kuhn's 2007 XM Satellite Radio interview
darkestnight: the works of Alain Boubil & Claude-Michel Schönberg
Judy Kuhn's Serious Playground Album on Ghostlight Records

1958 births
Actresses from Maryland
American women singers
American musical theatre actresses
American mezzo-sopranos
American voice actresses  
Living people
Oberlin College alumni
People from Bethesda, Maryland
Actresses from New York City  
Activists from New York City
20th-century American actresses
21st-century American actresses
Obie Award recipients
Georgetown Day School alumni
American people of Jewish descent
Jewish singers
21st-century American Jews
American activists
Walt Disney Records artists
Disney people